Overhead may be:

 Overhead (business), the ongoing operating costs of running a business
 Engineering overhead, ancillary design features required by a component of a device
 Overhead (computing), ancillary computation required by an algorithm or program
 Protocol overhead, additional bandwidth used by a communications protocol
 Line code or encoding overhead, additional bandwidth required for physical line transmission
 Overhead information, for telecommunication systems
 File system overhead, storage or other consideration required by a file system that is not directly related to data
 Any physical object situated, or action occurring above:
 Overhead line, for power transmission
 Overhead cable, for signal transmission
 Overhead projector, a display system
 Overhead cam, a mechanical device
 Overhead join, in air traffic control
 Overhead press, an upper-body weight training exercise in
 Overhead crane or bridge crane, a type of crane sliding on two parallel rails

See also
 Overkill (disambiguation)